The 1997–98 Argentine Primera B Nacional was the 12th season of second division professional of football in Argentina. A total of 32 teams competed; the champion and runner-up were promoted to Argentine Primera División.

Club information

Interior Zone

Metropolitana Zone

Interior Zone standings

Metropolitana Zone standings

Championship Group
It was divided in 2 groups with the 16 teams that qualified from Interior and Metropolitana Zone placed 1st to 8th and were mixed. The team placed 1st of each group qualified for the Promotion Playoff, and the teams placed 2nd and 3rd qualified for the Second Promotion Playoff.

Group A

Group B

Relegation Group
It was divided in 2 groups with the 16 teams that qualified from Interior and Metropolitana Zone placed 9th to 16th. The team placed 1st of each group qualified for the Second Promotion Playoff.

Interior Group

Metropolitano Group

Promotion Playoff
The promotion playoff was played by the winner of Group A, Talleres (C) and the winner of Group B, Belgrano. The winning team was declared champion and was automatically promoted to Primera Division. The losing team joined in semifinals of the Second Promotion Playoff.

|-
!colspan="5"|Final

Second Promotion Playoff
The Second promotion playoff or Torneo Reducido was played by the teams placed 2nd and 3rd of each group of the Championship Group: Quilmes and Chacarita Juniors (Group A), All Boys and Banfield (Group B), and the teams placed 1st of each group of the Relegation Group: Aldosivi (Interior Group) and Almagro (Metropolitano Group). In the semifinals joined Belgrano, the losing team of the First Promotion Playoff. The winner was promoted to Primera Division.

First round

|-
!colspan="5"|First Round

|-
!colspan="5"|First Round

|-
!colspan="5"|First Round

Semifinals

|-
!colspan="5"|Semifinals

|-
!colspan="5"|Semifinals

Final

|-
!colspan="5"|Final

Relegation
Note: Clubs with indirect affiliation with AFA are relegated to the Torneo Argentino A, while clubs directly affiliated face relegation to Primera B Metropolitana. Clubs with direct affiliation are all from Greater Buenos Aires, with the exception of Newell's, Rosario Central, Central Córdoba and Argentino de Rosario, all from Rosario, and Unión and Colón from Santa Fe.

Interior Zone

Metropolitana Zone

Promotion/relegation playoff
Teams placed 7th and 8th of the Relegation Table Interior Zone (Douglas Haig and Chaco For Ever), played a promotion/relegation playoff or Torneo Reclasificatorio, with Huracán (SR) and Villa Mitre, teams from Torneo Argentino A. The winner was Douglas Haig and remained in the Primera B Nacional, while Huracán (SR) and Villa Mitre remained in Torneo Argentino A and Chaco For Ever was relegated to it.

Semifinals

Final

See also
1997–98 in Argentine football

References

External links

Primera B Nacional seasons
2
1997 in South American football leagues
1998 in South American football leagues